Banana News Network or BNN was a Pakistani TV show that was broadcast on GEO TV on Tuesdays at 11:05pm. It originally starred Murtaza Chaudhry and his team who were formerly part of 4 Man Show on Aaj TV.

Concept
BNN puts a comical spin on the happenings in Pakistan. It is a fictitious channel in which celebrities are mocked. The show has segments such as Sports Desk, News Room and Central Studio discussion. Celebrities mocked most often include Mirza Iqbal Baig, Ansar Abbasi and politicians. The main difference between BNN and other comedy Pakistani shows is that only four cast members are employed and they dress up as different celebrities on each show.

Cast
 Murtaza Chaudhry as Khalid Butt (Host)
 Mustafa Chaudhry as Various celebrities' mimic
 Mubeen Gabol as Matkoo and various celebrities' mimic
 Mohsin Abbas Haider as Bhagat Singh
 Shafaat Ali as Various celebrities' mimic
 Waheed Khan as Lala and various celebrities' mimic
 Asad Khalil
 Yasir Ali

Parting
The show was restarted in autumn 2013 without Murtaza Chaudhry, Mustafa Chaudhry and Mohsin Abbas Haider. Haider left the show to join Mazaaq Raat on Dunya TV.

References 

Geo News